Engelsbach may refer to:

 Engelsbach (Aubach), a river of Rhineland-Palatinate, Germany, tributary of the Aubach
 Melbbach, also called Engelsbach, a river of North Rhine-Westphalia, Germany, tributary of the Rhine
 Engelsbach, a locality of the municipality Leinatal in Thuringia, Germany